The 2004 NBA draft was held on June 24, 2004, at The Theater at Madison Square Garden in New York City, and was broadcast live on ESPN at 7:00 pm (EDT). In this draft, National Basketball Association teams took turns selecting amateur college basketball players and other first-time eligible players. The NBA announced that 56 college and high school players and 38 international players had filed as early-entry candidates for the 2004 draft. On May 26, the NBA draft lottery was conducted for the teams that did not make the NBA Playoffs in the 2003–04 NBA season. The Orlando Magic, who had a 25 percent chance of obtaining the first selection, won the lottery, while the Los Angeles Clippers and the Chicago Bulls were second and third respectively. As an expansion team, the Charlotte Bobcats had been assigned the fourth selection in the draft and did not participate in the lottery. The Minnesota Timberwolves forfeited their first-round pick due to salary cap violations.

By the end of the draft, around 40% of the players selected in it were born from countries outside the United States. It would remain the highest influx of international players selected in the modern NBA draft era until the 2016 NBA draft, where almost half of the selected players were born in countries outside the US. In addition, four of the players selected in the draft were Russians, which not only marked the highest number of players born in that region to be taken in one draft, but also was the highest representation of a country in one draft until 2016 when five Frenchmen would be taken in the draft.

After the completion of the regular season, Emeka Okafor, the Bobcats' historical first rookie draft pick back when they were considered an expansion franchise, was named Rookie of the Year, while Ben Gordon earned the Sixth Man Award, becoming the first rookie in NBA history to do so.

Dwight Howard has become an NBA Champion, eight-time All-Star, and has received seven All-NBA selections, and a three-time NBA Defensive Player of the Year. He also had the distinction as the only NBA player straight out of high school to start all 82 games as a rookie. There are also four other players that would be named All-Stars at some point in their careers, and Al Jefferson would be named to an All-NBA team. The draft is also notable for many high schoolers being drafted within a few picks from each other. As of 2022, the only remaining active player from the 2004 NBA draft is Andre Iguodala.

Draft selections

Notable undrafted players
These players not selected in the draft have played at least one game in the NBA.

Early entrants

College underclassmen
The following college basketball players successfully applied for early draft entrance.

  Chris Acker – G, Chaminade (sophomore)
  Trevor Ariza – G/F, UCLA (freshman)
  Brandon Bender – F, Robert Morris (junior)
  Evan Burns – F, San Diego State (freshman)
  Josh Childress – F/G, Stanford (junior)
  Cortez Davis – F, Midland College (sophomore)
  Luol Deng – F, Duke (freshman)
 / Ben Gordon – G, Connecticut (junior)
  Devin Harris – G, Wisconsin (junior)
  David Harrison – C, Colorado (junior)
  JaQuan Hart – G, Eastern Michigan (junior)
  Kris Humphries – F, Minnesota (freshman)
  Sani Ibrahim – F, Gulf Coast CC (sophomore)
  Andre Iguodala – F, Arizona (sophomore)
  Kevin Martin – G, Western Carolina (junior)
  Emeka Okafor – F, Connecticut (junior)
  Randy Orr – C, Georgia Perimeter (sophomore) 
  Jason Parker – F, Chipola (junior)
  Donta Smith – F/G, Southeastern Illinois (sophomore)
  Kirk Snyder – G, Nevada (junior)
  Harvey Thomas – F, Baylor (junior)
  Delonte West – G, St. Joseph's (junior)

High school players
The following high school players successfully applied for early draft entrance.

  Jackie Butler – F, Coastal Christian Academy (Virginia Beach, Virginia)
  Dwight Howard – C, Southwest Atlanta Christian Academy (Atlanta, Georgia)
  Al Jefferson – F, Prentiss HS (Prentiss, Mississippi)
  Shaun Livingston – G, Peoria HS (Peoria, Illinois)
  J. R. Smith – G, St. Benedict's Prep (Newark, New Jersey)
  Josh Smith – F, Oak Hill Academy (Mouth of Wilson, Virginia)
  Robert Swift – C, Bakersfield HS (Bakersfield, California)
  Dorell Wright – G/F, South Kent (South Kent, Connecticut)

International players
The following international players successfully applied for early draft entrance.

  Andris Biedriņš – F, Skonto (Latvia)
  Hamed Haddadi – C, Paykan Tehran (Iran)
  Arturas Kaubrys – F, Neptūnas (Lithuania)
  Sergei Monia – G/F, CSKA Moscow (Russia)
  Pavel Podkolzin – C, Metis Varese (Italy)
  Peter John Ramos – C, Caguas (Puerto Rico)
  Jaber Rouzbahani – C, Zob Ahan (Iran)
  Ha Seung-jin – C, Yonsei (South Korea)
  Jerry Sokoloski – C, Father Henry Carr Catholic Secondary (Canada)
  Sasha Vujačić – G, Snaidero Udine (Italy)

Notes and references

See also
 List of first overall NBA draft picks

References

External links
 2004 NBA Draft

Draft
National Basketball Association draft
NBA draft
NBA draft
2000s in Manhattan
Basketball in New York City
Sporting events in New York City
Sports in Manhattan
Madison Square Garden